The Fleckner or Flecknerspitze is a peak of the Stubai Alps mountain range in South Tyrol, Italy. The peak has an elevation of 2331 m and on its top there is a large summit cross, which surrounded by green meadow during summer. There is hiking trail leading directly over the top and the mountain is a destination for ski tours during the winter as well.

Notes

References
Rudolf Weiss, Siegrun Weiss: Brenner-Region. Bergverlag Rother GmbH, 2003, S.128-129 

Mountains of South Tyrol
Stubai Alps
Mountains of the Alps